Daniel Grao Valle (born 17 February 1976) is a Spanish actor. He is known for his performances in television series such as Luna, el misterio de Calenda or Sin identidad, or his lead role in the biopic miniseries about Mario Conde.

Biography 
Born in 1976 in Sabadell, Catalonia, he discovered acting thanks to a high school teacher in Caldes de Montbui, where he lived with his family, becoming a member of an amateur theatrical group.

Grao had his debut as a television actor in the Catalan regional broadcaster TV3, with performances in shows such as Temps de silenci and El cor de la ciutat. A native Spanish-language speaker, he declared in 2020 that he reportedly moved to Madrid because of TV3, as in his first performances in the channel's shows "the accent was not on the quality of the performance but on the way he pronounced the 's's" (in Catalan).

His debut in a feature film came in 2003 with a minor role in La flaqueza del bolchevique. While he had previously performed in several stage plays, he landed his first major stage role with La avería.

He earned some recognition with performances in the TV series Amistades peligrosas and Sin tetas no hay paraíso, whereas Acusados (2009–2010) brought him further popularity. His performance in the Pedro Almodóvar's film Julieta (2016) further consolidated his career.

He played the role of Rafael Rodríguez Rapún, Federico García Lorca's lover, in La Piedra Oscura by Alberto Conojero in 2016 in Spain and France in 2016.

He landed the role of Bernat Estanyol (the father of the lead character) in the 2018 series La catedral del mar. He starred in the TV series Stolen Away, aired in 2020 on Antena 3, playing the lead character Antonio Santos.

Personal life 
Since 2004, Grao has been in a relationship with Florencia Fernández, with whom he has two children, Mirko and Guido.

Grao is openly bisexual.

Filmography 

Television

Film

References 

21st-century Spanish male actors
Spanish male television actors
Spanish male film actors
Spanish male stage actors
Bisexual male actors
Spanish LGBT actors
Spanish bisexual people
1976 births
Living people